Flawless Life is a 2012 Turkish animated short film written and directed by Özgül Gürbüz. The film won the Best Animation, Best Screenplay, Best Visual awards for Animated Film Category at the 2012 Los Angeles Woman's Independent Film Festival.

Plot 
One day a homeless man finds something and it changes his life...

References

External links
 
 Teaser on Vimeo
 

2010s animated short films
Turkish animated films
Turkish short films
Turkish animated short films